Jason Ward is an American-born singer-songwriter, who has experienced growing popularity since releasing the "Almighty Row" LP in 2009, which was quickly followed up by the "Graceful Bow" EP in 2010.  "Bless You", a single from "Graceful Bow", performed especially well online, gaining praise from bloggers for being upbeat, but notoriously "acerbic".  Ward has become increasingly popular with UK bloggers, especially due to his material's dark tone and his willingness to release digital content for free.

Early career
Jason Ward was born in Annapolis, Maryland, and raised on a tobacco farm in Calvert County, Maryland.  He began writing songs during high school, and had amassed nearly 350 compositions by the time he graduated from Shepherd University in 2005.  Soon after graduating from college, Ward started a two-year period of constantly recording lo-fi albums, and releasing them on CD-R's, though the albums were only distributed to friends and family members as they were recorded.

Almighty Row
Ward recorded Almighty Row during the Spring of 2009, and it was promoted as a dark concept album, consisting of a cohesive ten-song structure.  The instrumentation on "Almighty Row" was primarily an acoustic guitar, with layered vocals, and various atmospheric overdubs, including organ, string arrangements, and piano.

Ward released "Almighty Row" as a free digital download in November 2009, receiving positive reviews from several blogs, including Altsounds, Snob's Music, Cougar Microbes, This Winki's, Underskn, Slowcoustic, and Listen Dammit.  Cougar Microbes referred to Ward as "Neil Young on downers", while a positive review by Altsounds magazine stated, "He is Kurt Cobain if Nirvana had never happened...making music out of the public spotlight and staying well in control."

Graceful Bow EP
Hoping to take advantage of the online success of "Almighty Row", Ward compiled older singles from previous recording sessions into the 6-song "Graceful Bow" EP, which was released in February 2010, and received favorable reviews as well, primarily due to the singles, "Bless You" and "Here's Looking at You (From Behind)", which were songs noted as being of a more positive nature than the songs found on "Almighty Row". The song, "Dark in Here", from "Graceful Bow", appeared on television during an episode of A&E Biography in 2010.

Last Time I Was There
Ward's follow-up to "Almighty Row", "Last Time I Was There" was an effort to put out a more comprehensive album, focusing upon the struggles of other people through various points of perspective.  "Last Time I Was There" was self-released, through Bandcamp, in the Spring of 2011.

Television appearances
Several of Ward's songs have appeared on television programs in the US, Canada, the UK, and elsewhere.  In the US, Ward's songs have been placed on MTV's "16 and Pregnant" and "Teen Mom", A&E's "Biography" and "Rodeo Girls", TLC's "Making Over America", Discovery's "Auction Kings", Animal Planet's "Last Chance Highway", "My Life as Liz", and MTV's "Laguna Beach: The Real OC".

Film
Ward's song, "You Can Always Run Away", was used on the 2015 DVD release of "The Judge", starring Robert Downey, Jr. and Robert Duvall.

References

External links
  http://www.jason-ward.blogspot.com
   http://www.myspace.com/jasondward

1983 births
Living people
Writers from Annapolis, Maryland
American indie rock musicians
Songwriters from Maryland